Elizebath Barkat Khan (born 6 April 1989) is a Pakistani former cricketer who played as a right-arm medium-fast bowler. She appeared in one One Day Internationals and one Twenty20 Internationals for Pakistan in 2012. She played domestic cricket for Lahore, Balochistan, Punjab, Saif Sports Saga and State Bank of Pakistan.

References

External links
 
 

1989 births
Living people
Cricketers from Lahore
Pakistani women cricketers
Pakistan women One Day International cricketers
Pakistan women Twenty20 International cricketers
Lahore women cricketers
Baluchistan women cricketers
Punjab (Pakistan) women cricketers
Saif Sports Saga women cricketers
State Bank of Pakistan women cricketers